Marta Hazas Cuesta (born 31 December 1977) is a Spanish actress.

Career
Born in Santander on 31 December 1977, she earned a degree in Information Sciences, and she also took artistic training in Spanish dance and drama.

She is a Spanish actress who has acted sporadically in shows like Aída, Los hombres de Paco, Cuéntame cómo pasó, Paco y Veva, Hospital Central, El comisario and Los Serrano. She had a breakthrough role on the small screen with her performance as Amelia Ugarte in the series El internado. She also featured in Gran Hotel with Yon González, Amaia Salamanca and Eloy Azorín, among others. She starred as lead in the daily television series Bandolera. Most recently she played a main role during four seasons in the series of Antena 3 Velvet with Cecilia Freire, Javier Rey, Paula Echevarría and Adrián Lastra. She collaborated in El hormiguero.

Personal life
She has a West Highland Terrier dog since 2011 named Robin, named after Robin Wright. She married Javier Veiga on 1 October 2016 at Palacio de la Magdalena in Santander, Spain. The wedding was attended by Paula Echevarría and Cecilia Freire.

References

External links
 

1977 births
Living people
People from Santander, Spain
Spanish television actresses
Actors from Cantabria
21st-century Spanish actresses